Lucas Elvenes (born 18 August 1999), is a Swedish professional ice hockey forward currently playing for Leksands IF of the Swedish Hockey League (SHL). At the 2017 NHL Entry Draft, Elvenes was selected 127th overall by the Vegas Golden Knights.

Personal life
Lucas' father, Stefan Elvenes, was drafted in the fourth round of the 1988 NHL Entry Draft by the Chicago Blackhawks. He never played in North America, but played in the Swedish Hockey League and for Sweden's national team. Lucas' grandfather Björn emigrated from Norway in 1965.

Playing career
On June 16, 2018, Elvenes was signed to a three-year, entry-level contract with the Vegas Golden Knights. After attending the Golden Knights 2018 training camp, Elvenes was returned on loan to continue his development with Rögle BK of the SHL for the duration of the 2018–19 season on September 19, 2018.

Elvenes while on loan with Rögle BK, established new career bests with 17 assists and 20 points through 42 regular season games. After an early post-season exit, Elvenes was re-assigned by the Golden Knights to join AHL affiliate, the Chicago Wolves, in the midst of their playoff run.

During the  season, on January 10, 2022, Elvenes was placed on unconditional waivers for the purposes of contract termination by the Golden Knights. The Anaheim Ducks claimed him off waivers the next day. Elvenes remained in North America, accepting an assignment to the Ducks AHL affiliate, the San Diego Gulls. In regaining his scoring touch with the Gulls, Elvenes collected 9 goals and 33 points through 43 regular season games.

As an impending restricted free agent with the Ducks, Elvenes opted to return to his native Sweden after signing a two-year contact with newly promoted club, HV71 of the SHL, on 24 May 2022. Elvenes made just 3 appearances with HV71 to open the 2022–23 season before opting to end his contract and transfer to fellow SHL outfit, Leksands IF, on a three-year contract on 3 October 2022.

Career statistics

Regular season and playoffs

International

Awards and honors

References

External links
 

1999 births
Living people
Chicago Wolves players
Henderson Silver Knights players
HV71 players
Leksands IF players
IK Oskarshamn players
People from Ängelholm Municipality
Rögle BK players
San Diego Gulls (AHL) players
Swedish ice hockey centres
Swedish people of Norwegian descent
Vegas Golden Knights draft picks
Sportspeople from Skåne County